is a Japanese manga series written and illustrated by Mika Kawamura. The manga was serialized by Kodansha in Nakayoshi from February 1998 to March 2002, and the chapters were collected into nine tankōbon volumes. It was adapted into a 78-episode anime television series produced by NHK, animated by J.C.Staff, and directed by Hiroaki Sakurai, which was broadcast between March 2000 and February 2002 on NHK's BS2 broadcast satellite network. The series was one of the top-rated anime series during its initial broadcast.

The story follows two junior high school students, Miyu and Kanata, who find and care for an abandoned alien baby without any of them discovering that they are living together without adult supervision. The anime adaptation concluded before the manga was completed, resulting in different endings for each series. Kawamura later wrote a sequel to the manga, .

Plot
Miyu Kouzuki is an 8th-grade student whose parents left for the United States to work for NASA. They arrange for her to stay with their long-time family friend, Hōsho Saionji, a monk who lives in an old temple on a hill overlooking the town of Heiomachi. Hōshō leaves soon after on a year-long pilgrimage to India, leaving Miyu to stay in the same house with his son, Kanata.

Suddenly, a UFO lands in the honden of the temple. Inside is a humanoid alien baby, Ruu, and his catlike guardian, Wannyā. They arrived on Earth from their home planet, Otto, when they fell into an interplanetary wormhole. They cannot return to their home planet because it is too far from Earth; Wannyā asks Kanata and Miyu to allow them to stay in their house, and they agree. People from Planet Otto look identical to human beings, and that Wannyā can also transform into human beings, animals, and objects.

Miyu and Kanata come to love Baby Ruu, who also cares for them – thinking of them as his parents due to their similar looks – and they go to great lengths to help and protect him and Wannya. As the story progresses, the group is often involved in comedic and funny situations. Kanata realizes he is in love with Miyu but finds it hard to confess, while Miyu has the same problem.

In the end of the series, a rescue team from outer space returns Ruu and Wannyā to Otto safely. Miyu goes to boarding school alone. However, 6 years later, Miyu and Kanata reunite, marry and have a daughter named Miu; they also reunite with Wannya and Ruu.

Sequel 
In Shin Daa! Daa! Daa!, set many years later, Ruu meets a confused earthling girl called Miu that has arrived through a wormhole. Miu desperately wants to go home, and he agrees. Unbeknownst to him, Miu is the daughter of the same people who lovingly cared for him during his stay on Earth, Miyu Kōzuki and Kanata Saionji. They meet Ran, Ruu's best friend, a robot named Ann, and Mininyā, Wannyā's son.

Characters

 The main female character, a blonde, beautiful girl. Her parents leave for the United States to work for NASA at the beginning of the series, arranging for her to stay with their long-time family friend, Hōshō Saionji, a monk who lives at and runs an old Buddhist temple atop a hill. Hōshō leaves soon after to spend a year in India, leaving Miyu with Hōshō's son Kanata alone together.

Miyu often argues with Kanata at the beginning of the series, but finds out from her mother that they were childhood friends and begins to like him more and more, coming to love Kanata as the story progresses. At first, Miyu denies her feelings for him, but soon she begins to realize that she indeed likes him. In the manga, it is revealed that Miyu and Kanata have kissed twice. In volume 9 (chapter 46, page 34), Miyu wants to tell Kanata her true feelings towards him but could not. She also had a crush on Mizuki Yamamura, Mikan's younger brother. In the manga, Hanakomachi Kurita (Momoka's older brother) has a crush on Miyu, which makes her uneasy.

She feels a deep affection for Ruu, who feels like she is his mother due to their similar looks. Miyu is shown as an ordinary girl with a kind, generous, motherly personality. She is cheerful, with a ready smile, but also has a soft heart that is easily touched. In the episode "Nozomu-kun Goes to the Dream World", Miyu's deepest dream is to be together with her family (including Kanata's family – Hōshō and his late wife Hitomi – Ruu's family and Wannyā. She seems very caring towards Christine when, in the episode "The Hike of Fear", she told Wannyā not to hurt Christine. Chapter 41 reveals that Miyu is younger than Kanata. In the manga ending (which differs from the above-mentioned anime) Miyu did not change schools. Although they care for each other, Miyu and Kanata frequently argue, but in Episode 55, they admit their feelings for each other. Years later, she is shown married to Kanata, living with him at the temple with their daughter. Miyu's name is from Mi (Miki) and Yu (Yume).

 The male protagonist, one of the most popular boys in his school due to his good looks and attitude. Not only does he excel in all his studies, he is also good at sports. Shortly after Miyu arrives at the temple, Kanata's father Hōshō declares his intent to leave for a year-long trip to India to try to find enlightenment. He promptly leaves Kanata and Miyu alone living in the same house. The two have difficulty keeping their living together a secret, so they use the story that they are cousins as a cover. Kanata learns from Miyu's mother that they were childhood friends; he begins to like Miyu more and more, coming to love her as the story progresses (but he still teases her to mask it). Ruu calls Kanata "Papa", since he looks similar to his real father. Kanata’s best friend since childhood is Santa Kurosu.

Kanata is an easygoing person who does not like to talk very much, unlike Miyu. Although he seems quiet and a bit cold, Kanata is a loving, caring person. He has feelings for Miyu, but often makes a joke of it or sticks out his tongue to hide them. Initially, he refuses to express his true feelings for others. He was also often jealous of Seiya Yaboshi in episode 12, where he was mad at and worried about Miyu. He reveals his feelings to Miyu in episode 55 of the anime.

Kanata's favorite food is pumpkin in all its varieties: boiled, squashed, or fried as chips. In "The Blackout Halloween", it is revealed that Kanata had liked pumpkin since he was a baby, after his late mother fed it to him for the first time. His mother Hitomi died when Kanata was three years old; she was a good friend of Miyu's mother Miki. Kanata loved his mother very much, even though he had only known her for a short time. In chapter 41 of the manga, when Miyu and the others travel back in time, Kanata returns to when his mother was still alive. Miyu (who was wearing a yukata given her by Kanata) meets Kanata's mother; they are both wearing the same yukata.

In the manga, after Ruu and Wannyā return home to Planet Otto, Kanata confesses his love to Miyu and kisses her. Years later, he succeeds his father as the resident priest of Saionji, and is married to Miyu who lives with him and their daughter at the temple.

 also known as Lou
 Ruu is an alien baby from Planet Otto, who can levitate and perform telekinesis on objects. He develops a deep love for Miyu and Kanata, thinking of them as his parents, and often helping them. He uses his abilities at inappropriate times, causing great trouble for Miyu and Kanata. Although he is a baby, he understands everyone. Ruu does not like when Miyu and Kanata fight, as he demonstrates in the 25th episode "With Ruu-kun at the Department Store". In that, Ruu makes peace between his two "earth" parents. He is also revealed as an ordinary baby, who cries and laughs as "earth" babies do. To keep others from learning the truth about Ruu's identity, he is referred to as Miyu's little brother (although Ruu denies that, and insists on calling Miyu "Mama". Ruu believes Miyu and Kanata are his real parents, and does not learn the truth until the end of the series). In Shin Daa! Daa! Daa!, he finally saw and remembered his two "earth" parents after the accident. Ruu also develops feelings for Miu Saionji (the daughter of his earth parents) and confesses to her throughout the manga.

Miu Saionji (西遠寺未宇)
 Miu Saionji is Kanata and Miyu's daughter. She is in 6th grade and is currently 12 years old. She arrives at the planet Otto through a wormhole. Miu develops her feelings for Ruu through the series of the manga.

 Wannyā (also known as Baumiao, a play on "Bow-meow") is a cat-like alien "sitter pet" from Otto, entrusted to take care of Ruu. He can transform into a human being (his most common ones being a young blond man vaguely identified as Miyu’s relative and whom Mikan once liked, a dark-red-haired woman passed off as a housewife from the neighbourhood, or Hōshō), an animal or an object. He develops a passion for mitarashi dango (dumplings in sweet soy-based sauce), and writes about the day's events in his computerized "sitter pet" diary. Wannyā does all the cooking and cleaning in the house. He addresses Ruu as "Ruu-chama" (likely a portmanteau of chan, a term of endearment for children, and sama, a title denoting respect).

 Nicknamed "Chris", Christine is Miyu and Kanata's pink-haired, half-French (through her mother) and wealthy classmate. She is so infatuated with Kanata that she is prone to romantic fantasies about him, and becomes jealous when she sees him other girls, especially Miyu. When she sees the latter with Kanata, she jumps to conclusions about their situation and expresses her rage by demonstrating superhuman strength, picking up large objects (such as trees and desks) to throw or knocking down whole buildings. When she snaps out of one of her "episodes", she profusely and politely apologises, proceeding to fix the damage with tools (construction equipment, for example) kept in her magic satchel. Her jealous rampages and dark fantasies are usually shown for comic effect, but these are sometimes used in serious situations. Chris, however, appears oblivious to her supernatural powers; she is for the most part shy, kind, and friendly, often speaking in very formal Japanese. Coming from a rich family, her possessions include a vast estate, a winter lodge and a snow-capped mountain.

In the manga, Chris learns of Ruu's secret early on and promises not to tell, stating that she was ridiculed as a child for her red hair and uncommon appearance. In the anime, however, she does not discover his secret until the last few episodes. Christine's parents are never seen in the anime; the only visible adult in her household is the Hanakomachi butler Mr Shikada ("Mr. Deerfield" in English translations), who is dressed in a deer costume. He has been doing this for Chris since her childhood to make her happy, because of her love for deer. Her favorite pastimes include skiing and horseback riding.

 Christine's 3-year-old cousin. Momoka often rides her tricycle, and she is in love with Ruu, declaring that he is her boyfriend, going as far as to saying that she wants to marry him. Momoka has a grudge against Miyu and other older girls; she often calls them obā-chan, or "Madam" – a title used for an elderly woman or a grandmother, which infuriates Miyu. She appears to like Kanata very much, however, admitting he is cute and calling him "Kanata onii-chan". Momoka learns Miyu and Kanata's secret about aliens in their house in the episode "Momoka's Passport", when she saw Ruu fly up to recapture a balloon. From Episodes 4 to 30, she insists that men and women, no matter what their ages are, do not cry, but in Episode 31, it may be revealed that she was lying about that: saying that it's all right to cry, and viewers can tell by the look on her face when she cried with Ruu and Wannya, who are dressed as Rudolph the Red-Nosed Reindeer and Santa Claus, respectively, in the show's first Christmas episode.

 Aya is Miyu and Kanata's classmate, who is a very good friend of Miyu; they often go shopping with Nanami. She has greenish hair, with two braids. She likes writing and staging school plays (which she often directs). Much to Miyu and Kanata's displeasure, some of Aya's plays or projects are similar to their current life; they get annoyed when she casts Miyu and Kanata in lead roles. Things become much worse when Aya develops an interest in Ruu, and also features him in her plays. Occasionally, Aya will start speaking French when she gets excited. Sometimes when she gets an idea for a new play, an orange will appear on her head (similar to Mikan's); she says she is in "Mikan mode" when this happens.

 Nanami is Miyu and Kanata's classmate. She has short brown hair, and is a very good friend of Miyu; she often goes shopping with her and Aya. Nanami is usually very playful and energetic, but can sometimes get very tired after a hard task. She also has a huge appetite, and likes old-school-style clothes.

 Santa is Kanata's best friend, who is weird and often comes up with strange ideas. He loves old recordings. Miyu once thought that Santa had fallen in love with a girl, but later finds out that it was the girl's camera he admired. He first met Kanata through a TV show named Cactus Man (named for the main character), which had low ratings and was cancelled early. Kanata liked the show, though, because he felt the hero had more courage than other heroes. One day, while wearing a Cactus Man costume, he meets Santa (who is wearing an identical costume). Soon afterwards, they place their costumes in a time capsule, opening it ten years later with Miyu, Ruu, and Wannyā witnessing them. He has a pen pal, with whom he becomes friends; before she leaves for Germany, the two meet each other in person.

Santa's name is a play on the Japanese pronunciation of "Santa Claus", though this has no direct relation to his character. At the end of the manga he was dating a celebrity, Kyouko.

In his eyes, he is Kanata's rival. Nozomu is a classmate of Miyu and Kanata, who has blond hair. He has a pet bird named Okame, who helps him give out roses to the girls. He first appears at the start of the second season. Because he is continuously stalking Miyu, she begins to think he is an alien; she finds out later that Nozomu is interested in Kanata instead. At the end of the manga Nozomu becomes a magician, with Okame his assistant.

There are some differences in Nozomu's character between the manga and anime. In the manga, he was far more selfish and while he flirted with every girl like he did in the anime, none of them knew he flirted with everyone as they each believed he only flirted with one of them while in the anime he is more universal and open with his flirting as he flirts with every girl he sees, though the girls don't mind (possibly since he is not flirting with each one behind their backs). Also, during the beauty pageant which he competed in with Kanata to see who was the best (Kanata didn't really care but Nozomu did) while taking pictures of Kanata to enter into the competition, in the anime he saw Kanata push Mikan and thought he was attacking her and sent it in to show everyone what a bad person he seemed to be. However, upon earning it was a misunderstanding, he bowed his head and apologized to Kanata, demonstrating he truly did not mean harm and wanted a fair competition. In contrast, the Nozomu in the manga is far more devious and low as he purposely altered the picture to make Kanata look bad, showing he didn't mind cheating to win.

A budding manga artist, Mikan often sports a tangerine on her head (as do her relatives, including her pet Scottish fold cat) and her eyes are almost always shut. She is a very good friend of Kanata and Miyu, both of whom she helps; in turn, they help her with her manga. She has a handsome younger brother, Mizuki Yamamura, an inspiration for one of the characters in her manga who helps her with it. Mikan is often in a panic because of deadlines; she visits Kanata for consolation, and nearly finds out Miyu and Kanata's secret several times. Mizuki points out that Mikan never gave up on her dream on becoming a manga artist, despite her father's wish for her to become a baker. So far, Mikan has been successful in her chosen career. Although Mikan is often drawn comically and appears plain and stressed, she is pretty when wearing makeup and relaxed.

An avatar of the manga's author, Mika Kawamura. Her name Mikan means "tangerine" and Yama "mountain".

 Miki is Miyu's astronaut mother, who is obsessed with anything connected with outer space. She is hired by NASA (with her husband, Yū) at the beginning of the story, and must leave for the United States. She arranges for her daughter, Miyu, to live with the Saionjis. Her two childhood dreams were to have a beautiful daughter and to become an astronaut, both of which came true. She was friends with Kanata's mother, Hitomi, since they were teenagers.

 Yū is Miyu's astrophysicist father; he helps his wife with her work and is also hired by NASA. He became interested in astrophysics to further his wife's dream of becoming an astronaut and traveling in space. In episode 40, it is shown that Yū met Miki when they were in college and he asked her to join the astronomy club.

 Kanata's father is a Buddhist monk, the patriarch of the Saionji household and head priest of its temple. He seems very irresponsible, embarking on a pilgrimage to India soon after Miyu arrives at the Saionji household. In episode 40, it is explained that he met his wife Hitomi when she visited Saionji and asked him to take a picture of her, Miki, and their friends. The two began a long-distance relationship, reuniting after Hitomi had graduated from high school. Devastated by her death when Kanata was a toddler, he bursts into tears whenever she is discussed. This makes it difficult for Kanata to know more about her from his father.

 Kanata's late mother, who was a very good friend of Miyu's mother, Miki. She died when Kanata was still a child, and was buried on the grounds of Saionji. She seems to have been a kind and beautiful person. While in college, Hitomi encouraged Miki to continue pursuing her dream of becoming an astronaut when the latter doubted herself.

 Miyu and Kanata's class teacher she possesses numerous talents ranging from cooking to ninja-training. She is also a friend of Mikan.

Seiya is a blond alien who visits Earth and takes a liking to Miyu, often shapeshifting as Kanata to get close to her. His kind can read minds through a touch of the hand. He first appears in Episode 12; after touching Miyu's hand, he read her mind and wanted to take Ruu to planet Sharaku (his home planet) to appear on a television programme. People from Planet Otto were rare, but after reading Miyu's hand he understood that Ruu was precious to her and Kanata, causing him to cease pursuit of Ruu. Seiya has a sister, Rui, who saved him from being sucked into a wormhole, and has had a sheltered childhood.

His surname, Yaboshi, means "night star".

Rui is Seiya's older sister, who greatly cares for him. Seiya appears annoyed with her but truly cares for her, as seen Episode 28. She works at the Space Police Force cafeteria.

Rui's lover, who is Space Police Force's Space Detective. He is an honest yet hot-blooded man. His appearance is an homage to the tokusatsu genre.

The eccentric principal of Miyu and Kanata's school, who is extremely fond of monkeys, bananas and video games (especially monkey-based ones). His fascination with the creatures stemms from his friendship with his pet monkey, from whom he was separated in childhood when Monkichi was sucked into a wormhole. They are later reunited thanks to Miyu, Kanata, Ruu and Wannyā. Monkey dolls and figures adorn his office, where he is often found playing video games; he sometimes organizes school programs with monkey-based themes, much to the chagrin of the students.

A rabbit-like alien who becomes Ruu's pet in the second season, he accidentally fell out of a truck from outer space. He is a considerable glutton, and is oftentimes at odds with Wannyā. In the manga he is all white, and debuts late in volume seven; in the anime, his ears and tail are coloured pink.

The eldest of the three sisters in the Waruwaru Dan, she is a blonde woman who always put on dark glasses. Because they are poor, the Waruwaru Dan constantly plot to kidnap Ruu to get the TV show prize money. However, they will always fail. She makes various strange machines to help make ends meet; she was once a scientist who studied a space-time distortion on Planet Sharaku.

The middle Waruwaru Dan sister, she is a girl who wears Monpe (traditional Japanese work clothes for women). When not trying to kidnap Ruu, she and Guava are unsuccessfully selling various Inventions that most people find useless..

The youngest Waruwaru Dan sister, Guava is always in a round, bright blue costume with bear ears. She is in love with Hikarigaoka.

Akira is Kanata's childhood friend, who appears in episodes 33 and 34. She has long, black hair, and violet eyes. Four years before the series’ timeline, Kanata made a promise to her that they would watch the sunset together at Fantasy Park, which came true after she visited him when her father was on a business trip. Akira has a crush on Kanata, demonstrated by their conversation on the ferris wheel; she said to herself, "There is no one I like in America" when Kanata told her the sunsets must be beautiful in America. In the manga, she wants to feel what Miyu feels for Kanata by giving Kanata a fake kiss.

A manga-only character, who appears in chapter 15. Kurita is Momoka's older brother, who falls in love with Miyu at first sight. Kawamura describes him as seemingly nerdy "because he is always wearing those plain glasses, he seemes to be a plain-yet-innocent boy". Kanata describes him as someone who expresses his feelings honestly. When Kurita's glasses were knocked off accidentally, Miyu sees that he is a handsome boy.

Anime
The anime television series originally aired between 28 March 2000 and 26 February 2002 on the NHK-BS2 satellite TV network. It spanned a total of 78 episodes, and was directed by Hiroaki Sakurai.

List of episodes

Theme music

Performed by Reika Nakajima; lyrics: Yūko Matsuzaki; composition and arrangement: Toshio Masuda

"Boy Meets Girl" (first closing theme)
Performed by TRF; lyrics and composition: Tetsuya Komuro; arrangement: M.I.D.

"Happy Flower" (second opening theme)
Performed by Saori Nara; lyrics: Yūko Matsuzaki; composition and arrangement: Toshio Masuda

Performed by Hitomi Mieno; lyrics: Hitomi Mieno; composition and arrangement: Toshio Masuda

Game
The series was adapted into a card battle video game for the Game Boy Color, developed by Video System, which was released exclusively in Japan on December 8, 2000.

References

External links
 NHK official site 
 J.C. Staff official website 
 
 

1998 manga
2000 anime television series debuts
2002 manga
Japanese children's animated adventure television series
Japanese children's animated comic science fiction television series
J.C.Staff
Kodansha manga
NHK original programming
School life in anime and manga
Shōjo manga
Extraterrestrials in anime and manga